Kakamega Airport is a small airport in Kenya. It serves the town of Kakamega.

Location
Kakamega Airport  is in Kakamega County in the town of Kakamega, in western Kenya, close to the international border with the Republic of Uganda.

The geographic coordinates of this airport are 0° 16' 12.00"N, 34° 47' 0.00"E (Latitude: 0.270000; Longitude: 34.783332).

The airport currently receives weekly flights by SkyWard Express from Wilson airport (Nairobi).

See also
 Kenya Airports Authority
 Kenya Civil Aviation Authority
 List of airports in Kenya

References

External links
  Location of Kakamega Airport at Google Maps
  Website of Kenya Airports Authority
  Airkenya Flight Routes

Airports in Kenya
Kakamega County